Esko Rajakoski (30 January 1934–20 October 2002) was a Finnish diplomat. He served as ambassador of Finland in various countries, including Venezuela and Argentina.

Biography
Rajakoski was born in Helsinki on 30 January 1934. He was a bachelor of political science. In 1975 he was named as the special envoy and a plenipotential minister. He was a negotiating officer from 1980 to 1983, ambassador to Buenos Aires in 1983–1987, Caracas 1989–1994 and Prague 1994–1999. He died on 20 October 2002.

References

20th-century diplomats
1934 births
2002 deaths
Ambassadors of Finland to Argentina
Ambassadors of Finland to Venezuela
Ambassadors of Finland to the Czech Republic